Portland Public Schools (PPS) (officially Portland School District 1J) is a public school district located in Portland, Oregon, United States. It is the largest school district in the state of Oregon. It is a PK–12 district with an enrollment of more than 49,000 students. It comprises more than 100 locations, including 79 schools and other sites that are maintained within the district.

History

19th century
In the 1850s, when the first public schools were formed in Portland, free education was a new concept.  On December 6, 1851, the following advertisement appeared in The Oregonian:
In pursuance of a vote of the Portland school district at their annual meeting, the directors have established a free school. The first term will commence on Monday, the 15th inst., at the schoolhouse in this city, near the City Hotel. (John W.  Outhouse, teacher.) The directors would recommend the following books to be used in the school, viz.: Sandler's Series of Readers and Spellers, Goodrich's Geography, Thompson's Arithmetics and Bullion's Grammar.
John Outhouse served as the schoolteacher, and was paid 100 dollars a month. The school was held in a school house at the corner of First and Oak Streets, in what is now Northwest Portland, and had just 20 students at first.

The early public schools were met with some criticism. An editorial in The Oregonian on July 3, 1852 stated that the Common School Council was "self-called, self-elected, that voted a thousand dollars in addition to be paid by our citizens for pedagoguing some dozen or two of children."

Abigail Clarke was hired at the beginning of the third term in 1852, due to increased attendance and a $1600 tax to pay for the schools.  She was paid 75 dollars a month, and taught at a new school building, on First and Taylor Streets.  By the third term, 126 students were enrolled in all, and an average of 90 showed up each day.  Clarke was known to "thrash" boys who made a sport of rapping on the windows of the school, which faced out to the street.  She continued to teach until the summer of 1853, when she moved to Oregon City.

In December 1854, Thomas Frazer wrote a notice in The Oregonian to try to create a school board for Portland.  Many responded, and the first school board consisted of Frazer himself, William S. Ladd, and Shubrick Norris as directors.  The first superintendent of Multnomah County was L. Limerick, who was appointed in January 1855.

On December 18, 1854, the school board organized two school districts, named School District Number 1 and School District Number 2, divided by Morrison Street.  On March 31, 1856, they were merged into a single School District Number 1.

School District Number 1 opened a school in fall 1855, presumably replacing the school started by Outhouse and Clarke. This school was presided over by Sylvester Pennoyer and closed in six months, as the funds were exhausted. In 1858, a new schoolhouse was built, financed by canceling school for a year. The school was located at Sixth and Morrison and named the Central School. The Central School location was later occupied by the Portland Hotel and is now Pioneer Courthouse Square. A high school, Portland High School, was opened in 1869, and a night school program was created at the high school in 1889.

In the 1860s, the school budget was very low, about $10 per student per year. William S. Ladd, known for being thrifty, raised objections to the school paying for supplies such as ink, requiring students to instead make their own by boiling oak bark and carrying it in animal horns.

In 1867, shoemaker William Brown, one of approximately 200 black people then living in Portland, sued the school district for refusing to educate the 16 black children in the city. The Colored School opened in fall 1867, discontinuing in 1872 when a local referendum supported integration. By December 1873, 30 students (out of 1048) in the district were black.

By the end of the 1870s, there were four elementary schools: Central School (1858–?), Harrison School (1866–?), Colored School (1867–1872), and North School (1868–?).

Portland schools were questioned by Harvey W. Scott and The Oregonian in 1880, especially regarding the efficacy and practicality of public high schools. The yearly cost to educate a student in 1879 in Portland was $24.06.

A compulsory education program was enacted in Oregon on February 25, 1889. By 1891, the district contained 95 teachers, seven elementary schools, one high school, and one night school. The schools were described as crowded by The Oregonian at that time. Other school districts in East Portland and Albina were combined in 1891 (with 83% of residents voting in favor of consolidation). This added nine elementary schools, 74 teachers, and 2698 students to the system.

20th century

The St. Johns (school) District was annexed on July 7, 1915, and the James John High School was added at this time. On the suggestion of superintendent Lewis H. Alderman, high school dances were allowed by the school board beginning in 1915, with the stipulation that "the parents of a majority of the students attend." Portable classrooms were used, especially in 1919, with 60 portables added. By this time, there were evening schools taught at Benson High School, Girls' Polytechnic (later merged with Benson), Commerce, Jefferson High School, Ladd, and Lincoln High School. A new administration building opened at NE 7th Ave and NE Clackamas St in the Lloyd District.

On June 21, 1924, a $5 million bond was passed to build and remodel schools over the next five years, part of a planned three-part construction program expected to last 15 years and cost $15 million. Four new schools were planned during the first five years. By 1927, there were 43,419 elementary students served.

In 1930, the Great Depression caused a decrease in the number of elementary students enrolled, but an increase in both men and women in the high schools. The 1931 annual report stated: "At no previous time has the question of clothing, books, and carfare been so serious. Realizing that idleness is perhaps the greatest contributing factor toward delinquency, we hope to double our efforts this fall in the attempt to keep every child in school who should be there." Teacher salaries, school year length, and other cost-cutting measures were made in 1932–1933.

A new superintendent, Ralph E. Dugdale, began on August 26, 1937. He strongly believed "the schools of Portland were training people for jobs that did not exist," and began making aggressive curriculum and organizational changes. Twelve committees (with 169 faculty) over elementary education were created, and monthly report cards were canceled (in 1950, this was described as a "nationwide trend of discarding the antiquated method of sending monthly reports on student grades to parents."). Instead, occasional and irregular reports on academics and citizenship were sent home. Examinations on general knowledge and knowledge of educational development were instituted for new instructors. High school students were required to pass a minimum number of credits per semester, and then were evaluated to see if an alternative school would work better.

The district trained a large number of defense workers in the national defense program, in preparation for World War II. About 10,000 men were trained in 1941 in airplane construction, shipbuilding, and other fields. During September 1942, 4400 additional elementary students enrolled. Ten teachers were added. There was an increased number of freshmen and sophomores in the high schools, but an overall loss of 832 students due to war industries and enlistment. By 1942, there were 63,238 school-age students, with 54,655 registered, and 1,613 instructors in 76 buildings.

In 1945, Dr. Willard B. Spalding, superintendent since 1943, issued a 120-page report titled "Modernizing the School Plant", calling for a $25 million building program and projecting major changes in store. Fighting with Governor Earl Snell for a special legislative session, high school students struck for a day. In August 1946, 50 kindergartens were closed due to lack of funds and instructors. Other large cost-cutting measures were taken, including discussion of closing high school sports programs. Spalding and his assistant superintendent went on recruiting trips in the south and east states. Spalding resigned on June 30, 1947 to become the dean of the College of Education at the University of Illinois.

Dr. Paul A. Rehmus was the next superintendent, notable for having the highest annual salary of any superintendent in the history of Portland Public Schools to this time- $13,000. Rehmus rejected progressive education, stating "The term 'progressive education' as a definite school of teaching method does not exist. The demarcation between what is formal and what is progressive education is almost impossible to define." In 1947, a $25 million levy was approved by voters, as well as $1.7 million to balance the operational budget.

On June 30, 1949, there were 73,972 school-age students in the district boundaries, with 49,825 registered for school. The district had 1,828 teachers and 76 buildings.

In October 1949 a "secret society problem" developed where three high school fraternities were involved in the "manhandling of a girl student." 50 boys had taken part in the incident, part of an initiation. An emergency school board meeting led to the banning of secret societies in the district. Parents and adult members of these secret societies filed a lawsuit in 1950.

Three high schools were voted to close in 1981: Jackson High School in southwest Portland, Adams High School in northeast Portland, and Washington-Monroe High School in the inner eastside. The Adams and Jackson closures were done after a 3:30am vote of school board members, and a board member had to be followed home by a police escort. The closures were done due to low enrollment and to balance the budget, but the community and a board member threatened lawsuits.

Enrollment in PPS continued to decline until 2010 and now slow growth is projected.  Faced with some very small schools (200–350 students) the district has undertaken what is intended to be a continual process of Enrollment Balancing to deal with anemic programs in some schools and overcrowded buildings in others.

21st century

Since 2000, there have been concerns about lead and radon in Portland Public School buildings. In 2016, an overly large amount of lead was found in two schools. All PPS schools were ordered to use bottled water for the rest of the year instead of drinking from water fountains, and to use bottled water for food preparation and dish washing as well.  Controversy surrounding poorly and infrequently tested water for lead led to Superintendent Carole Smith stepping down in July 2016, a year before her ten-year term ended. In August 2017, Guadalupe Guerrero became the new Superintendent.

Voters approved a $482 million bond measure in November 2012 to upgrade several schools, including Grant High School, Franklin High School, and Roosevelt High School. In May 2017, an additional $790 million bond measure was passed to reopen Kellogg Middle School and modernize three other schools: Madison High School, Benson Polytechnic High School, and Lincoln High School.

In 2020 the district ended the regular use of school resource officers and Guerrero announced plans to re-examine how the school district is partnered with the Portland Police Bureau.

Demographics

In the 2009–2010 school year, PPS enrolled 81.6% of the city's available school-age children. Nonetheless, total school enrollment was declining, accompanying a change in Portland's demographics. As a result, the Portland Public Schools are facing increasing budget pressure.

In the 2009 school year, the district had 1706 students classified as homeless by the Department of Education, or 3.8% of students in the district.

List of schools

Elementary schools (K–5)

Mixed grade 
Grade ranges of schools listed below are K–8 unless noted.

Middle schools (6–8)

High schools (9–12)

Closed high schools
 Adams High School (closed 1981)
 Jackson High School (closed 1981)
 James John High School (closed 1921)
 Marshall High School (closed 2011)
 Monroe High School (closed 1978)
 Washington-Monroe High School (closed 1981)

Leadership

Curriculum

Superintendent 

 Guadalupe Guerrero

School Board 
As of 2020, the school board consists of:

 Andrew Scott (Zone #1)
 Michelle DePass (Zone #2)
 Amy Carlsen Kohnstamm (Zone #3)
 Rita Moore (Zone #4)
 Scott Bailey (Zone #5), vice-chair
 Julia Brim-Edwards (Zone #6)
 Eilidh Lowerey (Zone #7), chair

Student Representatives 
In addition to seven board members, every year a student representative is chosen to serve on the board for an entire school year. Although his or her vote does not technically count, the student member is allowed to vote on issues and sit on the committees along with the board members. Student representatives are treated as active board members and are addressed by the title "Student Director". They may recommend certain policies for the board to pass. The current student representative is:

 Jackson Weinberg

Immersion programs
PPS has several language immersion programs. The largest is the Spanish immersion program, which is offered at ten of the elementary schools, as well as at the middle and high schools that these schools feed into. Russian is offered at Kelly Elementary, which feeds into Lane Middle, and then to Franklin High School.  There are also Japanese, Chinese, and Vietnamese immersion programs.

See also 

 David Douglas School District, serving part of eastern Portland
 List of school districts in Oregon
 Multnomah Education Service District
 Title 20 of the United States Code

Notes

References

External links

 Portland Public Schools (official site)
 
 District map

 
Education in Portland, Oregon
School districts in Oregon
1851 establishments in Oregon Territory
School districts established in 1851